Altarduken Glacier is a small glacier just east of The Altar at the head of Grautskala Cirque, in the Humboldt Mountains of Queen Maud Land, Antarctica. It was discovered and mapped from air photos by the Third German Antarctic Expedition, 1938–39, but was remapped by Norway from air photos and surveys by the Sixth Norwegian Antarctic Expedition, 1956–60, and named Altarduken (the altar cloth) in association with The Altar.

See also
 List of glaciers in the Antarctic
 Glaciology

References
 

Glaciers of Queen Maud Land
Humboldt Mountains (Antarctica)